The Comp Air Jet is an American eight-seat, low-wing, pressurized, tricycle undercarriage, turbofan-powered civil utility aircraft marketed by Comp Air for amateur construction.

The company website does not list it as being in production in 2022.

Design and development
In 2002 the co-owners of Aerocomp, which is now known as Comp Air, Steve Young and Ron Lueck announced the Comp Air Jet project. The jet is constructed from a "proprietary carbon-fiber hybrid sandwich" and powered by a Ukrainian Ivchenko AI-25 engine. Alternative engines planned for included the Pratt & Whitney JT12-8 or CJ610 or projected future Williams International or Agilis engines.

On July 10, 2004 the Comp Air Jet flew for the first time from Merritt Island Airport. The jet landed after 37 minutes with the landing taking about 2000 feet.

On January 11, 2005 Aerocomp flew the prototype back to the Merritt Island Airport for further development work after more than 30 hours of flight testing at Space Coast Regional Airport, Titusville, Florida.

Operational history
As of April 2011 the prototype remained the sole example registered with the Federal Aviation Administration.

Specifications (Comp Air Jet)

See also

References

External links
Official website archives on Archive.org

Jet
Homebuilt aircraft
2000s United States civil utility aircraft
Very light jets
Single-engined jet aircraft
Low-wing aircraft
Aircraft first flown in 2004